Victoire (French, 'victory') or Victoires may refer to:

People
 Victoire of France (1733–1799), daughter of King Louis XV of France
 Victoire Babois (1760–1839), French poet and writer of elegies
 Victoire Conroy (1819–1866), a disliked childhood companion of the future Queen Victoria
 Victoire Doutreleau (born 1934), French fashion model
 Victoire Du Bois (born 1988/89), French actress
 Victoire de Rohan (1743–1807), Princess of Guéméné, French noblewoman and governess of the children of King Louis XVI of France
 Victoire Ferrari (1785–1823), French pianist and singing teacher
Victoire Jasmin (born 1955), French politician
 Victoire Jean-Baptiste (1861–1923), Haitian politician de facto as mistress of President Florvil Hyppolite
 Victoire Léodile Béra (1824–1900), French novelist, journalist and feminist
 Victoire Rasoamanarivo (1848–1894), a woman from Madagascar who devoted her life to the poor and the sick, beatified in 1989
 Victoire Thivisol (born 1991), French film actress
 Victoire Tomegah Dogbé (born 1959), Prime Minister of Togo
 Victoire Ingabire Umuhoza (born 1968), Rwandan politician
 Victoire Wirix (1875–1938), Dutch artist

Places
 Victoire, Saskatchewan, Canada
 La Victoire, Nord, Haiti
 Victoire tram stop, Bordeaux, France

Other uses
 French ship Victoire, the name of several ships
 Victoire Weasley, a fictional character in the Harry Potter series
 Victoire, a 2004 film, starring Sylvie Testud as Victoire
 Disques Victoire, a Canadian independent record label

See also
 Victory (disambiguation)
 Victorious (disambiguation)
 Victory Square (disambiguation), including Place de la Victoire
 Place des Victoires, in Paris, France

French feminine given names